Tommasi is an Italian surname. Notable people with the surname include:

Adolfo Tommasi (1851–1933), Italian painter
Alejandro Tommasi (born 1957), Mexican television, stage and film actor
Angiolo Tommasi (1858-1923), Italian painter
Bruno Tommasi (1930–2015), Italian Roman Catholic bishop
Corrado Tommasi-Crudeli (1834–1900), Italian physician
Damiano Tommasi (born 1974), former Italian football player, current president of the Italian Footballers' Association
Giovanni Battista Tommasi (1731–1805), Italian nobleman and 73rd Prince and Grand Master of the Order of Malta
Giovanni Tommasi Ferroni (born 1967), Italian artist
Joseph Tommasi (1951–1975), American National Socialist
Joseph Tommasi (Communist) (1886–1926), early leader of the French Communist Party
Ludovico Tommasi (1866–1941), Italian painter
Ludovik Mifsud Tommasi (1796–1879), Maltese priest and writer
Luiz Roberto Tommasi, Brazilian zoologist 
Rodolfo Tommasi (1907-1993), Italian football player
Rodolfo Tommasi (journalist) (1946-2015), Italian journalist, writer, musical and literary critic 
Sara Tommasi, Italian former actress and television personality

See also
Tomasi, a given name and surname
Tomassi (disambiguation)

Italian-language surnames
Patronymic surnames
Surnames from given names